Mullaiyar  is a river flowing in the Tiruvarur district of the Indian state of Tamil Nadu. It is a tributary of the Kaveri river, and flows into the Bay of Bengal.

Course
The river is a tributary river of Kaveri and cuts into the Koraiyar River, then flows through Tiruvarur district and joins the sea Bay of Bengal near the city of Karaikal.

See also 
 List of rivers of Tamil Nadu

References 

Rivers of Tamil Nadu
Tiruvarur district
Rivers of India